The Bremke is a  long headstream of the Warme Bode in Saxony-Anhalt and Lower Saxony, Germany.

For its entire length the stream forms the boundary between the two German federal states and until 1990 between East and West Germany. Even today the old East German convoy road has survived not far from the eastern bank of the stream.

See also
Bremke, a village in the Gemeinde Gleichen in southern Lower Saxony
List of rivers of Lower Saxony
List of rivers of Saxony-Anhalt

Rivers of Lower Saxony
Rivers of Saxony-Anhalt
Rivers of the Harz
Goslar (district)
Rivers of Germany